Langit Lupa (International title/Translation: Heaven and Earth) is a 2016 Philippine family drama television series directed by Carlo Po Artillaga and Myla Ajero-Gaite, starring Xia Vigor and Yesha Camile in the title role. The series premiered on ABS-CBN's PrimeTanghali noontime block and worldwide on The Filipino Channel on November 28, 2016 to April 28, 2017, replacing Be My Lady and was replaced by Ikaw Lang ang Iibigin.

This series was streaming online on YouTube.

Plot
The story begins with Dey (Alessandra De Rossi) and Lala (Yam Concepcion), who promised each other that they will face all the obstacles in life and be bestfriends forever. They started being friends since they were young. They had a shoe business, got married, and later on became mothers. They both named their children "Princess".

A big challenge will ruin their friendship when Ian (Patrick Garcia), Lala's husband, stole Lala and Dey's shares on the company to pay his loans. This becomes more challenging when Dey was hospitalized because of cardiac arrest, so Joey (Jason Abalos), Dey's husband, needs money for Dey's operation and has no choice but to ask Dey's shares from Lala. However, Lala can't provide anything since the money was stolen by Ian, which led to Dey's death. This soon led to Joey's hatred towards Lala.

Ian left the country to stay away from Lala after stealing the money. Meanwhile, Joey, together with Lolo Pogi (Boboy Garovillo), Jun-Jun (Jairus Aquino), and baby Esang (Yesha Camile), moved on and started a new life without Dey.

Years after, Esang (Yesha Camile) and Princess (Xia Vigor) grew up; Esang, Dey and Joey's child, grew up with a loving and caring family even if they are not rich; Princess, Lala and Ian's child, grew up in a wealthy family that has no time for each other.

Esang and Princess became schoolmates. They started as enemies but ended up as bestfriends when Esang took care of Princess' dog, Pencil, but Esang named it "Yoyo".

Cast and characters

Main cast

Supporting cast

Extended cast
 Lilet as Teresa Principe
 Jean Saburit as Valerie
 Kitkat as Gigi
 Ron Morales as Bong 
 Niña Dolino as Wilma
 Vivo Ouano as Mark
 Frenchie Dy as Shirley
 Gerard Acao as Benjie
 Ryan Rems as Jawo
 Angelo Ilagan as Jordan
 Paulo Angeles as Ivan
 Barbie Imperial as Jenny
 Dominic Roque as Luis
 Nhikzy Calma as Paeng
 Jef Gaitan as Monique
 Igi Boy Flores as Obet
 John Bermudo as Toyo
 Rhett Romero as Ricky
 Freddie Webb as Mario
 Irra Cenina as Teacher Brian

Special participation
 Trisha Redd Yosa as young Dey
 Faye Alhambra as young Lala
 Symon de Lena as young Jun-Jun/Batas
 CX Navarro as preteen Jun-Jun/Batas
 Elia Ilano as young Heart
 Cheska Iñigo as Margaret
 Bugoy Cariño as young Keith
 Ashley Sarmiento as young Issa

Episodes

Reception

See also
List of programs broadcast by ABS-CBN
List of ABS-CBN drama series

References

External links
 

ABS-CBN drama series
Philippine romantic comedy television series
2010s children's television series
2016 Philippine television series debuts
2017 Philippine television series endings
Filipino-language television shows
Television shows filmed in the Philippines
Television shows filmed in Hong Kong